The Netherlands Football League Championship 1911–1912 was contested by eighteen teams participating in two divisions. The national champion would be determined by a play-off featuring the winners of the eastern and western football division of the Netherlands. Sparta Rotterdam won this year's championship by beating GVC Wageningen 3-1 and 5–0.

New entrants
Eerste Klasse East:
Go Ahead
ZAC

Eerste Klasse West:
AFC Ajax

Divisions

Eerste Klasse East

Eerste Klasse West

Championship play-off

Sparta Rotterdam won the championship.

References
RSSSF Netherlands Football League Championships 1898-1954
RSSSF Eerste Klasse Oost
RSSSF Eerste Klasse West

Netherlands Football League Championship seasons
1911–12 in Dutch football
Netherlands